Congregation Beth El is a Conservative synagogue located in Voorhees, New Jersey. As of 2014, the clergy included Rabbi Aaron Krupnick, Hazzan Alisa Pomerantz-Boro, Rabbi Andy Green, and Rabbi Isaac Furman.

Congregation Beth El was founded in 1921, in Parkside, Camden, at Park Boulevard and Belleview, opposite Farnham Park. It was Camden's first conservative synagogue.  The congregation had an annual Chanukah Ball beginning in 1922, a religious school beginning two years later, a Hebrew Free Loan Society, a Hebrew ladies charity society, and in the 1930s hosted sorority and fraternity meetings on Tuesday nights.  Its synagogue building was demolished in 2000, and a Boys and Girls Club was built in its location.

Beth El relocated in 1967 to 2901 West Chapel Avenue in suburban Cherry Hill. William Zorach's sculpture "Memorial to 6,000,000 Jews" (1949) was located at it. Beth El was the oldest conservative synagogue in Cherry Hill. In 2009, Beth El sold its Chapel Avenue property to a 2,500-member Christian congregation based in Philadelphia.

On April 5, 2009, members of Beth El walked 6½ miles transporting 10 Torahs to the new synagogue in neighboring Voorhees, within the Main Street Complex. With the sale of the Chapel Avenue property, assessed at $9.9 million, the Voorhees campus consists of a 1,200-seat sanctuary, 500-person social hall, coffee bar and administrative offices. The remainder was raised through congregant donations.

References

External links 

Buildings and structures in Camden County, New Jersey
Conservative synagogues in New Jersey
Jewish organizations established in 1921
Voorhees Township, New Jersey
1921 establishments in New Jersey
Synagogues completed in 2009